The Maritime Youth Parliament, originally the Maritime Christian Youth Parliament, was a youth model parliament for young people in the provinces of Nova Scotia, New Brunswick, and Prince Edward Island. It was one of the provincial youth parliaments that founded and participated in the Youth Parliament of Canada/Parlement jeunesse du Canada.

Canadian youth parliaments